Wadi ash-Shajina (English: Shagna Valley) is a Palestinian village in the Hebron Governorate, in the south of the West Bank.

Demographics 

 Population: 817 (2020)

References 

Hebron Governorate
Villages in the West Bank
Municipalities of the State of Palestine